Durgawati (also called Durgaoti or Durgauti) is a community development block in Kaimur district in Indian state of Bihar . It is geographically located between 25° 12' 41" north latitude and 83° 31' 51" east longitude. It is located at an altitude of 76 m (249 ft) above mean sea level. Its headquarters is 30.6 km by road north of the district headquarters, Bhabua, on National Highway 19 (old NH 2).

Durgawati is the hub of transport routes in Kaimur district, next to Mohania.

Geography and climate

Geography
Durgawati has an average elevation of 76 metres (249 feet). Durgawati is divided into wards. In the south, there is a river called Durgauti which merges into the river Karamnasa. Durgawati is the hub of transport routes in Kaimur district, next to the city Mohania. The famous temple Mundeshawari Devi is situated in Kaimur district. The route for this temple goes through Durgawati. Public Transport or hired vehicles are available for the temple Mundeshwari Devi from the Bus stand on NH-19 or the railway station.
There is a waterfall Telhar, approx 60 km in south.

Climate
Durgawati experiences a humid subtropical climate with large variations between summer and winter temperatures. Winters in Durgawati see very large diurnal variations, with warm days and downright cold nights. The dry summer starts in April and lasts until June, followed by the monsoon season from July to October. Very Cold waves from the Himalayan region cause temperatures to dip across the city in the winter from December to February and temperatures below  are not uncommon. Fog is common in the winters, while hot dry winds, called loo, blow in the summers.

Transport

Durgawati is well connected by air, rail and road with the major Indian cities like New Delhi, Mumbai, Kolkata, Chennai, Pune, Ahmedabad, Indore, Bhopal, Bhubaneswar, Gwalior, Jabalpur, Ujjain, Jaipur, Patna, Jamshedpur and Hyderabad. The town is 763 km from Delhi. One of the major factors in Durgawati's sustained existence as an inhabited city is its role as a transportation hub between different cities.
It is a subdivisional town in Kaimur district. The district headquarters, Bhabua, is 30 km southward from the railway station.

Road
 National Highway 19 (old NH 2, GT Road) crosses through the heart of the town.
The town is 196 km from Patna and 50 km from Varanasi by road.
There are also a few State Highways in the city SH-14.
Mohania is connected to Buxar via Ramgarh from the south and with Bhabua (district capital, Audhaura, Bhagwanpur) from the south.

Railway
The name of the railway station of Durgawati is Durgauti railway station, situated on Howrah–Gaya–Mughalsarai–New Delhi Grand Chord line. Dindayal Pandey and Sumit Pandey always demands for development of this station. They demands for stoppage of new train here.
The station code is " DGO".

Airport
Lal Bahadur Shastri International Airport, Varanasi, commonly known as Babatpur Airport, is the nearest airport, 67 km from Durgawati. Indian carriers, including Air India and Spicejet and international carriers like Air India, Thai Airways International, Korean Air and Naaz Airlines, operate from here.

Other

School 
 Inter Level High School ( Kanya Madhya Vidyalaya )
 Children's Academy
 St. John's School
 Saraswati Sisu Mandir

Bank
 Allahabad Bank 
 Madhya Bihar Gramin Bank
 Co-operative Bank
 Sahara India Bank

 State Bank of India
 HDFC Bank
 Union Bank of India
 Bank of Baroda
 Punjab National Bank
 Axis Bank ATM

Villages 
Durgawati block contains the following 108 villages:

References 

Cities and towns in Kaimur district